Le Passager may refer to the following films:

 Caravan to Vaccarès (film), 1974 film
 The Passenger (2005 Éric Caravaca film)